Laraesima nitida is a species of beetle in the family Cerambycidae. It was described by Monné in 1980. It is known from Brazil.

References

Compsosomatini
Beetles described in 1980
Insects of Brazil
Beetles of South America